Marie Antoinette or Marie-Antoinette is a feminine French blended given name from the root names Miriam and Antonius. Notable people referred to by this name include the following:

Given name
Marie Antoinette, whose birthname was Maria Antonia Josepha Johanna, (1755–1793), last Queen of France before the French Revolution
Duchess Marie Antoinette of Mecklenburg-Schwerin, (1884–1944), second daughter of Duke Paul Frederick of Mecklenburg and Princess Marie of Windisch-Graetz.
Marie-Antoinette de Geuser (1889–1918), French Carmelites
Marie-Antoinette Demagnez (1869–1925), French sculptor 
Marie-Antoinette Guy-Stéphan, known as Marie Guy-Stéphan (1818–1873), French dancer 
Marie-Antoinette Katoto (born 1998), French professional footballer 
Marie Antoinette Sarangaya Leviste, known as Toni Leviste (born 1973), Filipina equestrian
Marie-Antoinette Lix (1839–1909), French governess
Marie Antoinette Marcotte (1867–1929), French painter
Marie Antoinette Murat (1793–1847), member of the Houses of Murat and Hohenzollern-Sigmaringen, and Princess consort of Hohenzollern-Sigmaringe
Marie Antoinette Petersén (Maria Antonia Petersén) (1771–1855), Swedish violinist and singer
Marie-Antoinette Rose, Seychellois politician
Marie-Antoinette Tonnelat (1912–1980), French theoretical physicist
Marie Antoinette Wright, birthname of Free Marie (born 1968) American rapper and television personality
Princess Marie Antoinette of Schwarzburg (1898–1984), eldest child of Sizzo, Prince of Schwarzburg

Middle name
Rose Marie Antoinette Blommers-Schlösser (born 1944), Dutch herpetologist and entomologist

See also

Maria Antonia
María Antonieta
María Antonietta
Maria Antonina

Notes

French feminine given names